The Aston Medal is awarded by the British Mass Spectrometry Society to individuals who have worked in the United Kingdom and have made outstanding contributions to our understanding of the biological, chemical, engineering, mathematical, medical, or physical sciences relating directly to mass spectrometry. The medal is named after one of Britain's founders of mass spectrometry and 1922 Nobel prize winner Francis William Aston.

The award is made sporadically, with no more than one medal being awarded each year. Recipients of this honour receive a gold-plated medal with a portrait of Francis Aston as well as an award certificate.

Recipients 

 1989 – Allan Maccoll 
 1990 – John H. Beynon 
 1996 – Brian Green 
 1998 – Keith Jennings 
 1999 – Dai Games 
 2003 – Colin Pillinger 
 2005 – Tom Preston 
 2006 – John Todd 
 2008 – Robert Bateman 
 2010 – Richard Evershed 
 2011 – Carol Robinson 
 2013 – Tony Stace
 2017 – R. Graham Cooks

See also

 List of chemistry awards

References

External links
 Landmarks in the last 50 years of British Mass Spectrometry

Academic awards
Mass spectrometry awards
British science and technology awards